The 1976 VFL season was the 80th season of the Victorian Football League (VFL), the highest level senior Australian rules football competition in Victoria. The season featured twelve clubs, ran from 3 April until 25 September, and comprised a 22-game home-and-away season followed by a finals series featuring the top five clubs.

The premiership was won by the Hawthorn Football Club for the third time, after it defeated  by 30 points in the 1976 VFL Grand Final.

Premiership season
In 1976, the VFL competition consisted of twelve teams of 18 on-the-field players each, plus two substitute players, known as the 19th man and the 20th man. A player could be substituted for any reason; however, once substituted, a player could not return to the field of play under any circumstances.

Teams played each other in a home-and-away season of 22 rounds; matches 12 to 22 were the "home-and-way reverse" of matches 1 to 11 (except that rounds 14 and 15 were the reverse of 4 and 3 respectively).

Once the 22 round home-and-away season had finished, the 1976 VFL Premiers were determined by the specific format and conventions of the "McIntyre final five system".

Round 1

|- bgcolor="#CCCCFF"
| Home team
| Home team score
| Away team
| Away team score
| Venue
| Crowd
| Date
|- bgcolor="#FFFFFF"
| 
| 18.22 (130)
| 
| 10.13 (73)
| Princes Park
| 39,964
| 3 April 1976
|- bgcolor="#FFFFFF"
| 
| 9.10 (64)
| 
| 11.21 (87)
| Arden Street Oval
| 17,986
| 3 April 1976
|- bgcolor="#FFFFFF"
| 
| 13.11 (89)
| 
| 16.15 (111)
| Moorabbin Oval
| 22,879
| 3 April 1976
|- bgcolor="#FFFFFF"
| 
| 23.15 (153)
| 
| 25.7 (157)
| Lake Oval
| 15,173
| 3 April 1976
|- bgcolor="#FFFFFF"
| 
| 16.21 (117)
| 
| 14.14 (98)
| MCG
| 28,834
| 3 April 1976
|- bgcolor="#FFFFFF"
| 
| 16.16 (112)
| 
| 16.17 (113)
| Western Oval
| 25,274
| 3 April 1976

Round 2

|- bgcolor="#CCCCFF"
| Home team
| Home team score
| Away team
| Away team score
| Venue
| Crowd
| Date
|- bgcolor="#FFFFFF"
| 
| 20.11 (131)
| 
| 16.13 (109)
| Princes Park
| 14,586
| 10 April 1976
|- bgcolor="#FFFFFF"
| 
| 22.11 (143)
| 
| 14.11 (95)
| Kardinia Park
| 20,443
| 10 April 1976
|- bgcolor="#FFFFFF"
| 
| 14.17 (101)
| 
| 15.15 (105)
| Junction Oval
| 15,682
| 10 April 1976
|- bgcolor="#FFFFFF"
| 
| 16.27 (123)
| 
| 20.14 (134)
| Victoria Park
| 25,410
| 10 April 1976
|- bgcolor="#FFFFFF"
| 
| 16.9 (105)
| 
| 23.15 (153)
| MCG
| 26,707
| 10 April 1976
|- bgcolor="#FFFFFF"
| 
| 12.16 (88)
| 
| 14.16 (100)
| Windy Hill
| 26,687
| 10 April 1976

Round 3

|- bgcolor="#CCCCFF"
| Home team
| Home team score
| Away team
| Away team score
| Venue
| Crowd
| Date
|- bgcolor="#FFFFFF"
| 
| 20.14 (134)
| 
| 14.11 (95)
| Western Oval
| 22,580
| 17 April 1976
|- bgcolor="#FFFFFF"
| 
| 25.22 (172)
| 
| 12.12 (84)
| Princes Park
| 23,375
| 17 April 1976
|- bgcolor="#FFFFFF"
| 
| 6.12 (48)
| 
| 14.13 (97)
| VFL Park
| 32,648
| 17 April 1976
|- bgcolor="#FFFFFF"
| 
| 15.8 (98)
| 
| 20.13 (133)
| Windy Hill
| 21,167
| 19 April 1976
|- bgcolor="#FFFFFF"
| 
| 14.18 (102)
| 
| 12.11 (83)
| MCG
| 41,413
| 19 April 1976
|- bgcolor="#FFFFFF"
| 
| 16.10 (106)
| 
| 12.14 (86)
| Moorabbin Oval
| 26,931
| 19 April 1976

Round 4

|- bgcolor="#CCCCFF"
| Home team
| Home team score
| Away team
| Away team score
| Venue
| Crowd
| Date
|- bgcolor="#FFFFFF"
| 
| 17.15 (117)
| 
| 14.12 (96)
| Arden Street Oval
| 15,604
| 24 April 1976
|- bgcolor="#FFFFFF"
| 
| 16.18 (114)
| 
| 15.9 (99)
| Victoria Park
| 27,009
| 24 April 1976
|- bgcolor="#FFFFFF"
| 
| 19.12 (126)
| 
| 13.13 (91)
| Kardinia Park
| 16,244
| 24 April 1976
|- bgcolor="#FFFFFF"
| 
| 22.11 (143)
| 
| 16.13 (109)
| Lake Oval
| 17,300
| 24 April 1976
|- bgcolor="#FFFFFF"
| 
| 17.12 (114)
| 
| 24.13 (157)
| MCG
| 34,991
| 24 April 1976
|- bgcolor="#FFFFFF"
| 
| 14.20 (104)
| 
| 14.8 (92)
| VFL Park
| 27,040
| 24 April 1976

Round 5

|- bgcolor="#CCCCFF"
| Home team
| Home team score
| Away team
| Away team score
| Venue
| Crowd
| Date
|- bgcolor="#FFFFFF"
| 
| 15.13 (103)
| 
| 17.13 (115)
| Junction Oval
| 11,131
| 1 May 1976
|- bgcolor="#FFFFFF"
| 
| 10.15 (75)
| 
| 14.10 (94)
| Windy Hill
| 14,389
| 1 May 1976
|- bgcolor="#FFFFFF"
| 
| 8.19 (67)
| 
| 9.12 (66)
| Princes Park
| 20,327
| 1 May 1976
|- bgcolor="#FFFFFF"
| 
| 12.17 (89)
| 
| 15.20 (110)
| MCG
| 31,434
| 1 May 1976
|- bgcolor="#FFFFFF"
| 
| 19.19 (133)
| 
| 16.6 (102)
| Moorabbin Oval
| 28,737
| 1 May 1976
|- bgcolor="#FFFFFF"
| 
| 15.6 (96)
| 
| 13.12 (90)
| VFL Park
| 20,760
| 1 May 1976

Round 6

|- bgcolor="#CCCCFF"
| Home team
| Home team score
| Away team
| Away team score
| Venue
| Crowd
| Date
|- bgcolor="#FFFFFF"
| 
| 11.9 (75)
| 
| 10.10 (70)
| Western Oval
| 19,978
| 8 May 1976
|- bgcolor="#FFFFFF"
| 
| 14.13 (97)
| 
| 15.13 (103)
| Victoria Park
| 23,428
| 8 May 1976
|- bgcolor="#FFFFFF"
| 
| 16.12 (108)
| 
| 21.10 (136)
| Lake Oval
| 14,270
| 8 May 1976
|- bgcolor="#FFFFFF"
| 
| 19.21 (135)
| 
| 9.9 (63)
| Arden Street Oval
| 10,342
| 8 May 1976
|- bgcolor="#FFFFFF"
| 
| 7.20 (62)
| 
| 15.12 (102)
| Princes Park
| 27,055
| 8 May 1976
|- bgcolor="#FFFFFF"
| 
| 17.17 (119)
| 
| 9.10 (64)
| VFL Park
| 27,631
| 8 May 1976

Round 7

|- bgcolor="#CCCCFF"
| Home team
| Home team score
| Away team
| Away team score
| Venue
| Crowd
| Date
|- bgcolor="#FFFFFF"
| 
| 11.22 (88)
| 
| 12.15 (87)
| Junction Oval
| 11,267
| 15 May 1976
|- bgcolor="#FFFFFF"
| 
| 21.14 (140)
| 
| 9.15 (69)
| Princes Park
| 30,095
| 15 May 1976
|- bgcolor="#FFFFFF"
| 
| 14.13 (97)
| 
| 21.19 (145)
| MCG
| 25,876
| 15 May 1976
|- bgcolor="#FFFFFF"
| 
| 13.17 (95)
| 
| 14.9 (93)
| Kardinia Park
| 30,395
| 15 May 1976
|- bgcolor="#FFFFFF"
| 
| 9.15 (69)
| 
| 14.13 (97)
| Moorabbin Oval
| 19,864
| 15 May 1976
|- bgcolor="#FFFFFF"
| 
| 5.16 (46)
| 
| 11.9 (75)
| VFL Park
| 34,051
| 15 May 1976

Round 8

|- bgcolor="#CCCCFF"
| Home team
| Home team score
| Away team
| Away team score
| Venue
| Crowd
| Date
|- bgcolor="#FFFFFF"
| 
| 20.16 (136)
| 
| 11.10 (76)
| Princes Park
| 7,674
| 22 May 1976
|- bgcolor="#FFFFFF"
| 
| 7.3 (45)
| 
| 14.11 (95)
| Western Oval
| 24,495
| 22 May 1976
|- bgcolor="#FFFFFF"
| 
| 14.10 (94)
| 
| 12.12 (84)
| Windy Hill
| 14,618
| 22 May 1976
|- bgcolor="#FFFFFF"
| 
| 15.11 (101)
| 
| 9.19 (73)
| Victoria Park
| 16,880
| 22 May 1976
|- bgcolor="#FFFFFF"
| 
| 14.11 (95)
| 
| 9.15 (69)
| MCG
| 22,145
| 22 May 1976
|- bgcolor="#FFFFFF"
| 
| 15.14 (104)
| 
| 9.12 (66)
| VFL Park
| 15,148
| 22 May 1976

Round 9

|- bgcolor="#CCCCFF"
| Home team
| Home team score
| Away team
| Away team score
| Venue
| Crowd
| Date
|- bgcolor="#FFFFFF"
| 
| 15.19 (109)
| 
| 7.13 (55)
| MCG
| 26,094
| 29 May 1976
|- bgcolor="#FFFFFF"
| 
| 13.18 (96)
| 
| 13.10 (88)
| Lake Oval
| 14,222
| 29 May 1976
|- bgcolor="#FFFFFF"
| 
| 18.15 (123)
| 
| 14.12 (96)
| Princes Park
| 8,784
| 29 May 1976
|- bgcolor="#FFFFFF"
| 
| 8.10 (58)
| 
| 7.12 (54)
| Arden Street Oval
| 19,990
| 29 May 1976
|- bgcolor="#FFFFFF"
| 
| 14.18 (102)
| 
| 12.10 (82)
| Kardinia Park
| 27,649
| 29 May 1976
|- bgcolor="#FFFFFF"
| 
| 10.16 (76)
| 
| 13.8 (86)
| VFL Park
| 36,042
| 29 May 1976

Round 10

|- bgcolor="#CCCCFF"
| Home team
| Home team score
| Away team
| Away team score
| Venue
| Crowd
| Date
|- bgcolor="#FFFFFF"
| 
| 12.27 (99)
| 
| 19.10 (124)
| Moorabbin Oval
| 18,969
| 5 June 1976
|- bgcolor="#FFFFFF"
| 
| 12.15 (87)
| 
| 13.13 (91)
| Junction Oval
| 12,439
| 5 June 1976
|- bgcolor="#FFFFFF"
| 
| 11.10 (76)
| 
| 11.15 (81)
| Princes Park
| 24,492
| 5 June 1976
|- bgcolor="#FFFFFF"
| 
| 13.10 (88)
| 
| 15.10 (100)
| MCG
| 29,608
| 5 June 1976
|- bgcolor="#FFFFFF"
| 
| 14.19 (103)
| 
| 13.16 (94)
| Windy Hill
| 25,450
| 5 June 1976
|- bgcolor="#FFFFFF"
| 
| 19.8 (122)
| 
| 13.15 (93)
| VFL Park
| 27,469
| 5 June 1976

Round 11

|- bgcolor="#CCCCFF"
| Home team
| Home team score
| Away team
| Away team score
| Venue
| Crowd
| Date
|- bgcolor="#FFFFFF"
| 
| 19.13 (127)
| 
| 15.6 (96)
| Moorabbin Oval
| 21,681
| 12 June 1976
|- bgcolor="#FFFFFF"
| 
| 14.11 (95)
| 
| 18.13 (121)
| Lake Oval
| 19,008
| 12 June 1976
|- bgcolor="#FFFFFF"
| 
| 12.16 (88)
| 
| 12.18 (90)
| MCG
| 39,314
| 12 June 1976
|- bgcolor="#FFFFFF"
| 
| 11.22 (88)
| 
| 11.10 (76)
| Princes Park
| 33,594
| 14 June 1976
|- bgcolor="#FFFFFF"
| 
| 11.15 (81)
| 
| 9.10 (64)
| Western Oval
| 34,814
| 14 June 1976
|- bgcolor="#FFFFFF"
| 
| 13.22 (100)
| 
| 16.14 (110)
| VFL Park
| 25,558
| 14 June 1976

Round 12

|- bgcolor="#CCCCFF"
| Home team
| Home team score
| Away team
| Away team score
| Venue
| Crowd
| Date
|- bgcolor="#FFFFFF"
| 
| 13.19 (97)
| 
| 18.14 (122)
| Princes Park
| 14,072
| 19 June 1976
|- bgcolor="#FFFFFF"
| 
| 23.17 (155)
| 
| 6.15 (51)
| Kardinia Park
| 17,731
| 19 June 1976
|- bgcolor="#FFFFFF"
| 
| 22.14 (146)
| 
| 13.12 (90)
| Junction Oval
| 12,644
| 19 June 1976
|- bgcolor="#FFFFFF"
| 
| 12.17 (89)
| 
| 12.7 (79)
| Windy Hill
| 18,863
| 19 June 1976
|- bgcolor="#FFFFFF"
| 
| 12.10 (82)
| 
| 8.8 (56)
| Victoria Park
| 28,537
| 19 June 1976
|- bgcolor="#FFFFFF"
| 
| 8.13 (61)
| 
| 22.14 (146)
| VFL Park
| 20,529
| 19 June 1976

Round 13

|- bgcolor="#CCCCFF"
| Home team
| Home team score
| Away team
| Away team score
| Venue
| Crowd
| Date
|- bgcolor="#FFFFFF"
| 
| 7.10 (52)
| 
| 14.20 (104)
| Western Oval
| 13,464
| 26 June 1976
|- bgcolor="#FFFFFF"
| 
| 11.19 (85)
| 
| 9.14 (68)
| Princes Park
| 24,826
| 26 June 1976
|- bgcolor="#FFFFFF"
| 
| 9.13 (67)
| 
| 10.15 (75)
| Arden Street Oval
| 16,230
| 26 June 1976
|- bgcolor="#FFFFFF"
| 
| 15.12 (102)
| 
| 14.14 (98)
| MCG
| 28,608
| 26 June 1976
|- bgcolor="#FFFFFF"
| 
| 11.10 (76)
| 
| 13.17 (95)
| Moorabbin Oval
| 17,861
| 26 June 1976
|- bgcolor="#FFFFFF"
| 
| 17.19 (121)
| 
| 11.16 (82)
| VFL Park
| 28,537
| 26 June 1976

Round 14

|- bgcolor="#CCCCFF"
| Home team
| Home team score
| Away team
| Away team score
| Venue
| Crowd
| Date
|- bgcolor="#FFFFFF"
| 
| 5.7 (37)
| 
| 17.15 (117)
| Western Oval
| 13,307
| 3 July 1976
|- bgcolor="#FFFFFF"
| 
| 17.17 (119)
| 
| 13.18 (96)
| Junction Oval
| 13,788
| 3 July 1976
|- bgcolor="#FFFFFF"
| 
| 13.15 (93)
| 
| 12.6 (78)
| Windy Hill
| 14,462
| 3 July 1976
|- bgcolor="#FFFFFF"
| 
| 10.12 (72)
| 
| 13.11 (89)
| Moorabbin Oval
| 18,486
| 3 July 1976
|- bgcolor="#FFFFFF"
| 
| 23.13 (151)
| 
| 7.14 (56)
| MCG
| 36,477
| 3 July 1976
|- bgcolor="#FFFFFF"
| 
| 18.7 (115)
| 
| 6.22 (58)
| VFL Park
| 24,366
| 3 July 1976

Round 15

|- bgcolor="#CCCCFF"
| Home team
| Home team score
| Away team
| Away team score
| Venue
| Crowd
| Date
|- bgcolor="#FFFFFF"
| 
| 12.10 (82)
| 
| 11.11 (77)
| Arden Street Oval
| 18,421
| 10 July 1976
|- bgcolor="#FFFFFF"
| 
| 15.12 (102)
| 
| 9.9 (63)
| Kardinia Park
| 21,213
| 10 July 1976
|- bgcolor="#FFFFFF"
| 
| 12.8 (80)
| 
| 10.16 (76)
| Princes Park
| 25,340
| 10 July 1976
|- bgcolor="#FFFFFF"
| 
| 20.16 (136)
| 
| 17.14 (116)
| Lake Oval
| 12,226
| 10 July 1976
|- bgcolor="#FFFFFF"
| 
| 15.14 (104)
| 
| 18.11 (119)
| MCG
| 25,009
| 10 July 1976
|- bgcolor="#FFFFFF"
| 
| 16.11 (107)
| 
| 18.11 (119)
| VFL Park
| 27,353
| 10 July 1976

Round 16

|- bgcolor="#CCCCFF"
| Home team
| Home team score
| Away team
| Away team score
| Venue
| Crowd
| Date
|- bgcolor="#FFFFFF"
| 
| 15.14 (104)
| 
| 18.13 (121)
| Victoria Park
| 22,680
| 17 July 1976
|- bgcolor="#FFFFFF"
| 
| 22.13 (145)
| 
| 12.6 (78)
| Arden Street Oval
| 19,334
| 17 July 1976
|- bgcolor="#FFFFFF"
| 
| 21.20 (146)
| 
| 15.16 (106)
| MCG
| 16,187
| 17 July 1976
|- bgcolor="#FFFFFF"
| 
| 15.17 (107)
| 
| 18.15 (123)
| Princes Park
| 16,257
| 17 July 1976
|- bgcolor="#FFFFFF"
| 
| 14.10 (94)
| 
| 15.10 (100)
| Lake Oval
| 17,395
| 17 July 1976
|- bgcolor="#FFFFFF"
| 
| 15.6 (96)
| 
| 12.19 (91)
| VFL Park
| 22,795
| 17 July 1976

Round 17

|- bgcolor="#CCCCFF"
| Home team
| Home team score
| Away team
| Away team score
| Venue
| Crowd
| Date
|- bgcolor="#FFFFFF"
| 
| 11.7 (73)
| 
| 13.14 (92)
| Junction Oval
| 12,614
| 24 July 1976
|- bgcolor="#FFFFFF"
| 
| 8.15 (63)
| 
| 15.16 (106)
| Windy Hill
| 21,585
| 24 July 1976
|- bgcolor="#FFFFFF"
| 
| 17.14 (116)
| 
| 11.19 (85)
| Princes Park
| 26,164
| 24 July 1976
|- bgcolor="#FFFFFF"
| 
| 17.16 (118)
| 
| 15.14 (104)
| Moorabbin Oval
| 19,882
| 24 July 1976
|- bgcolor="#FFFFFF"
| 
| 15.9 (99)
| 
| 11.27 (93)
| Kardinia Park
| 22,349
| 24 July 1976
|- bgcolor="#FFFFFF"
| 
| 11.13 (79)
| 
| 14.9 (93)
| VFL Park
| 17,580
| 24 July 1976

Round 18

|- bgcolor="#CCCCFF"
| Home team
| Home team score
| Away team
| Away team score
| Venue
| Crowd
| Date
|- bgcolor="#FFFFFF"
| 
| 16.17 (113)
| 
| 14.11 (95)
| Princes Park
| 7,519
| 31 July 1976
|- bgcolor="#FFFFFF"
| 
| 13.8 (86)
| 
| 10.14 (74)
| Western Oval
| 16,069
| 31 July 1976
|- bgcolor="#FFFFFF"
| 
| 8.10 (58)
| 
| 9.8 (62)
| Victoria Park
| 19,464
| 31 July 1976
|- bgcolor="#FFFFFF"
| 
| 16.11 (107)
| 
| 11.14 (80)
| Lake Oval
| 9,784
| 31 July 1976
|- bgcolor="#FFFFFF"
| 
| 8.17 (65)
| 
| 22.16 (148)
| MCG
| 39,744
| 31 July 1976
|- bgcolor="#FFFFFF"
| 
| 12.7 (79)
| 
| 17.15 (117)
| VFL Park
| 26,572
| 31 July 1976

Round 19

|- bgcolor="#CCCCFF"
| Home team
| Home team score
| Away team
| Away team score
| Venue
| Crowd
| Date
|- bgcolor="#FFFFFF"
| 
| 17.17 (119)
| 
| 13.11 (89)
| MCG
| 16,585
| 7 August 1976
|- bgcolor="#FFFFFF"
| 
| 22.19 (151)
| 
| 7.8 (50)
| Princes Park
| 19,356
| 7 August 1976
|- bgcolor="#FFFFFF"
| 
| 8.13 (61)
| 
| 7.8 (50)
| Arden Street Oval
| 13,719
| 7 August 1976
|- bgcolor="#FFFFFF"
| 
| 18.8 (116)
| 
| 18.14 (122)
| Kardinia Park
| 17,762
| 7 August 1976
|- bgcolor="#FFFFFF"
| 
| 17.15 (117)
| 
| 9.16 (70)
| Junction Oval
| 12,247
| 7 August 1976
|- bgcolor="#FFFFFF"
| 
| 12.11 (83)
| 
| 13.19 (97)
| VFL Park
| 18,640
| 7 August 1976

Round 20

|- bgcolor="#CCCCFF"
| Home team
| Home team score
| Away team
| Away team score
| Venue
| Crowd
| Date
|- bgcolor="#FFFFFF"
| 
| 16.14 (110)
| 
| 12.12 (84)
| MCG
| 20,817
| 14 August 1976
|- bgcolor="#FFFFFF"
| 
| 12.19 (91)
| 
| 14.10 (94)
| Junction Oval
| 10,417
| 14 August 1976
|- bgcolor="#FFFFFF"
| 
| 10.9 (69)
| 
| 14.11 (95)
| Windy Hill
| 22,474
| 14 August 1976
|- bgcolor="#FFFFFF"
| 
| 13.14 (92)
| 
| 18.21 (129)
| Moorabbin Oval
| 18,089
| 14 August 1976
|- bgcolor="#FFFFFF"
| 
| 18.16 (124)
| 
| 15.9 (99)
| Western Oval
| 17,805
| 14 August 1976
|- bgcolor="#FFFFFF"
| 
| 11.16 (82)
| 
| 5.12 (42)
| VFL Park
| 35,279
| 14 August 1976

Round 21

|- bgcolor="#CCCCFF"
| Home team
| Home team score
| Away team
| Away team score
| Venue
| Crowd
| Date
|- bgcolor="#FFFFFF"
| 
| 11.16 (82)
| 
| 17.12 (114)
| Princes Park
| 13,574
| 21 August 1976
|- bgcolor="#FFFFFF"
| 
| 20.20 (140)
| 
| 12.17 (89)
| Victoria Park
| 19,036
| 21 August 1976
|- bgcolor="#FFFFFF"
| 
| 15.18 (108)
| 
| 10.6 (66)
| Lake Oval
| 12,997
| 21 August 1976
|- bgcolor="#FFFFFF"
| 
| 22.18 (150)
| 
| 16.9 (105)
| MCG
| 28,130
| 21 August 1976
|- bgcolor="#FFFFFF"
| 
| 10.15 (75)
| 
| 18.16 (124)
| Arden Street Oval
| 26,455
| 21 August 1976
|- bgcolor="#FFFFFF"
| 
| 4.11 (35)
| 
| 3.16 (34)
| VFL Park
| 15,638
| 21 August 1976

Round 22

|- bgcolor="#CCCCFF"
| Home team
| Home team score
| Away team
| Away team score
| Venue
| Crowd
| Date
|- bgcolor="#FFFFFF"
| 
| 19.14 (128)
| 
| 12.19 (91)
| Arden Street Oval
| 14,196
| 28 August 1976
|- bgcolor="#FFFFFF"
| 
| 13.18 (96)
| 
| 10.11 (71)
| Kardinia Park
| 22,916
| 28 August 1976
|- bgcolor="#FFFFFF"
| 
| 17.11 (113)
| 
| 18.20 (128)
| Victoria Park
| 28,354
| 28 August 1976
|- bgcolor="#FFFFFF"
| 
| 15.17 (107)
| 
| 15.17 (107)
| Princes Park
| 27,958
| 28 August 1976
|- bgcolor="#FFFFFF"
| 
| 15.20 (110)
| 
| 10.18 (78)
| Junction Oval
| 11,721
| 28 August 1976
|- bgcolor="#FFFFFF"
| 
| 21.14 (140)
| 
| 14.22 (106)
| VFL Park
| 27,249
| 28 August 1976

Ladder

Finals

Elimination final

|- bgcolor="#CCCCFF"
| Home team
| Score
| Away team
| Score
| Venue
| Crowd
| Date
|- bgcolor="#FFFFFF"
| 
| 14.18 (102)
| 
| 14.11 (95)
| VFL Park
| 50,686
| 4 September

Qualifying final

|- bgcolor="#CCCCFF"
| Home team
| Score
| Away team
| Score
| Venue
| Crowd
| Date
|- bgcolor="#FFFFFF"
| 
| 14.19 (103)
| 
| 12.11 (83)
| MCG
| 64,148
| 4 September
|- bgcolor="#FFFFFF"

Semi-finals

|- bgcolor="#CCCCFF"
| Home team
| Score
| Away team
| Score
| Venue
| Crowd
| Date
|- bgcolor="#FFFFFF"
| 
| 8.12 60
| 
| 14.9 (93)
| MCG
| 71,042
| 11 September
|- bgcolor="#FFFFFF"
| 
| 9.16 (70)
| 
| 12.15 (87)
| VFL Park
| 60,105
| 11 September

Preliminary final

|- bgcolor="#CCCCFF"
| Home team
| Score
| Away team
| Score
| Venue
| Crowd
| Date
|- bgcolor="#FFFFFF"
| 
| 9.12 (66)
| 
| 10.7 (67)
| VFL Park
| 69,234
| 18 September

Grand final

|- bgcolor="#CCCCFF"
| Home team
| Score
| Away team
| Score
| Venue
| Crowd
| Date
|- bgcolor="#FFFFFF"
| 
| 13.22 (100)
| 
| 10.10 (70)
| MCG
| 110,143
| 25 September

Awards
 The 1976 VFL Premiership team was Hawthorn.
 The VFL's leading goalkicker was Larry Donohue of Geelong who kicked 105 goals (including 6 goals in the finals).
 The winner of the 1976 Brownlow Medal was Graham Moss of Essendon with 48 votes.
 Collingwood took the "wooden spoon" for the first time in 1976.
Collingwood 23.17 (155) defeated  19.15 (129) in the grand final, held as a curtain-raiser to the seniors Grand Final at the Melbourne Cricket Ground on 25 September.

Notable events
 The VFL introduced two field umpires per match.
 John Nicholls resigned as coach of Carlton three days before the VFL season commenced. Assistant coach Ian Thorogood was promoted to coach.
 The opening round match between South Melbourne and Geelong at the Lake Oval saw the Swans set a new record for the highest losing score on record, beating Melbourne's 1940 previous record.
 The Round 1 match between Carlton and Collingwood at Princes Park saw a massive all-in brawl that involved virtually every player from both sides, with Collingwood's Phil Carman the chief target.
 In Round 10, North Melbourne's Malcolm Blight kicked a booming torpedo punt 65–70 metres out from goal after the final siren at Princes Park, which sailed through for a goal that won the match for North Melbourne. HSV Channel 7 football commentator Michael Williamson exclaimed after the match, "I have seen it all, now. I have seen it all!!" ("The Sensational Seventies -- 1976." Screened on HSV 7 Melbourne in September 1979) 
 The Round 21 match between Footscray and Fitzroy at VFL Park was the first match to provide the lowest two scores of a season.
 Collingwood "won" its maiden wooden spoon after seventy-nine years, leaving Carlton as the only foundation VFL team yet to finish last. Carlton would "win" its maiden wooden spoon twenty-six years later in 2002.
 Collingwood's six wins is the most by a wooden spooner in VFL/AFL history.

References

Bibliography
 Rogers, S. & Brown, A., Every Game Ever Played: VFL/AFL Results 1897–1997 (Sixth Edition), Viking Books, (Ringwood), 1998. 
 Ross, J. (ed), 100 Years of Australian Football 1897–1996: The Complete Story of the AFL, All the Big Stories, All the Great Pictures, All the Champions, Every AFL Season Reported, Viking, (Ringwood), 1996.

External links
 1976 Season – AFL Tables

Australian Football League seasons
VFL season